Praveen Kumar is an Indian film producer. Started his career as Production manager with film like Money Money, Gulabi, Anaganaga Oka Roju and Rangeela. And started producing films independently with movies like Kalusukovalani, Bhagyalakshmi Bumper Draw and Pothe Poni in 2006.

Career

1995 - 2008
Kumar started his career in Telugu film industry as an executive in-charge of production with Rangeela in 1995. Later associated with director RGV for film Money Money as production manager in the same year and also for Krishna Vamshi's film Gulabi.

2009 - Now 
Since 2009, Praveen kumar is Ram Charan's Business manager, who worked with Ram Charan for movies Magadheera, Oragne, Racha, Naayak, Thoofan, Yevadu, Govindudu Andarivadele and now with Bruce Lee - The Fighter he is also Executive producer.

Filmography

As producer

Early career

References

External links

Living people
Film producers from Andhra Pradesh
Telugu film producers
Year of birth missing (living people)